The telegrapher's equations (or just telegraph equations) are a pair of coupled, linear partial differential equations that describe the voltage and current on an electrical transmission line with distance and time. The equations come from Oliver Heaviside who developed the transmission line model starting with an August 1876 paper, On the Extra Current. The model demonstrates that the electromagnetic waves can be reflected on the wire, and that wave patterns can form along the line.

The theory applies to transmission lines of all frequencies including direct current and high-frequency. Originally developed to describe telegraph wires, the theory can also be applied to radio frequency conductors, audio frequency (such as telephone lines), low frequency (such as power lines), and pulses of direct current. It can also be used to electrically model wire radio antennas as truncated single-conductor transmission lines.

Distributed components

The telegrapher's equations, like all other equations describing electrical phenomena, result from Maxwell's equations. In a more practical approach, one assumes that the conductors are composed of an infinite series of two-port elementary components, each representing an infinitesimally short segment of the transmission line:

 The distributed resistance  of the conductors is represented by a series resistor (expressed in ohms per unit length).  In practical conductors, at higher frequencies,  increases approximately proportional to the square root of frequency due to the skin effect.
 The distributed inductance  (due to the magnetic field around the wires, self-inductance, etc.) is represented by a series inductor (henries per unit length).
 The capacitance  between the two conductors is represented by a shunt capacitor C (farads per unit length).
 The conductance  of the dielectric material separating the two conductors is represented by a shunt resistor between the signal wire and the return wire (siemens per unit length). This resistor in the model has a resistance of  ohms.  accounts for both bulk conductivity of the dielectric and dielectric loss.  If the dielectric is an ideal vacuum, then .

The model consists of an infinite series of the infinitesimal elements shown in the figure, and that the values of the components are specified per unit length so the picture of the component can be misleading. These quantities can also be known as the primary line constants to distinguish from the secondary line constants derived from them, these being the characteristic impedance, the propagation constant, attenuation constant and phase constant. All these constants are constant with respect to time, voltage and current. They may be non-constant functions of frequency.

Role of different components

The role of the different components can be visualized based on the animation at right.
 Inductance  The inductance makes it look like the current has inertia – i.e. with a large inductance, it is difficult to increase or decrease the current flow at any given point. Large inductance  makes the wave move more slowly, just as waves travel more slowly down a heavy rope than a light string. Large inductance also increases the line's surge impedance (more voltage needed to push the same  current through the line).
 Capacitance  The capacitance controls how much the bunched-up electrons within each conductor repel, attract, or divert the electrons in the other conductor. By deflecting some of these bunched up electrons, the speed of the wave and its strength (voltage) are both reduced. With a larger capacitance, there is less repulsion, because the other line (which always has the opposite charge) partly cancels out these repulsive forces within each conductor. Larger capacitance equals weaker restoring forces, making the wave move slightly slower, and also gives the transmission line a lower surge impedance (less voltage needed to push the same  current through the line).
 Resistance  Resistance corresponds to resistance interior to the two lines, combined. That resistance  dissipates a little of the voltage along the line as heat deposited into the conductor, leaving the current unchanged. Generally, the line resistance is very low, compared to inductive reactance  at radio frequencies, and for simplicity is treated as if it were zero, with any voltage dissipation or wire heating accounted for as an afterthought, with slight corrections to the "lossless line" calculation deducted later, or just ignored.
 Conductance  Conductance between the lines represents how well current can "leak" from one line to the other, and higher  dissipates more current as heat, deposited in whatever serves as insulation between the two conductors. Generally, wire insulation (including air) is quite good, and the conductance is almost nothing compared to the capacitive susceptance , and for simplicity is treated as if it were zero; the caveat is that materials that are good insulation at low frequencies are often "leaky" at very high frequencies.

Values of primary parameters for telephone cable

Representative parameter data for 24-gauge telephone polyethylene insulated cable (PIC) at 70 °F (294 K)
{| class="wikitable"
|-
! Frequency
! colspan="2" | 
! colspan="2" | 
! colspan="2" | 
! colspan="2" | 
|-
! Hz
! 
! 
! 
! 
! 
! 
! 
! 
|-
|align=center|    1 Hz || 172.24 ||align=right|  52.50 || 612.9 || 186.8 ||align=right|   0.000 ||align=right|  0.000 || 51.57 || 15.72
|-
|align=center|   1 kHz || 172.28 ||align=right|  52.51 || 612.5 || 186.7 ||align=right|   0.072 ||align=right|  0.022 || 51.57 || 15.72
|-
|align=center|  10 kHz || 172.70 ||align=right|  52.64 || 609.9 || 185.9 ||align=right|   0.531 ||align=right|  0.162 || 51.57 || 15.72
|-
|align=center| 100 kHz || 191.63 ||align=right|  58.41 || 580.7 || 177.0 ||align=right|   3.327 ||align=right|  1.197 || 51.57 || 15.72
|-
|align=center|   1 MHz || 463.59 ||align=right| 141.30 || 506.2 || 154.3 ||align=right|  29.111 ||align=right|  8.873 || 51.57 || 15.72
|-
|align=center|   2 MHz || 643.14 ||align=right| 196.03 || 486.2 || 148.2 ||align=right|  53.205 ||align=right| 16.217 || 51.57 || 15.72
|-
|align=center|  5 MHz || 999.41 ||align=right| 304.62 || 467.5 || 142.5 ||align=right| 118.074 ||align=right| 35.989 || 51.57 || 15.72
|}
More extensive tables and tables for other wire gauges, operating temperatures, and insulation are available in Reeve (1995). Chen (2004) gives the same data in a parameterized form, that he reports is usable up to 50 MHz.

The constancy of the capacitance is a consequence of intentional, careful design.

The variation of  can be inferred from Terman: "The power factor ... tends to be independent of frequency, since the fraction of energy lost during each cycle ... is substantially independent of the number of cycles per second over wide frequency ranges."
A function of the form

with  close to 1.0 would fit Terman's statement. Chen gives an equation of similar form.

(·) in this table can be modeled well with

In practice, before that point is reached, a transmission line with a better dielectric is used. In long distance rigid coaxial cable, to get very low dielectric losses, the solid dielectric may be replaced by air with plastic spacers at intervals to keep the center conductor on axis.

The equations
The telegrapher's equations are:

They can be combined to get two partial differential equations, each with only one dependent variable, either  or :

Except for the dependent variable ( or ) the formulas are identical.

General solution for terminated lines of finite length
Let

be the Fourier transform of the input voltage  then the general solutions for voltage and current are

and

being the transfer function of the line,

the series impedance per unit length, and

the shunt admittance per unit length (reciprocal of the shunt  impedance). The parameter  represents the total length of the line, and  locates an arbitrary intermediate position along the line.  is the impedance of the electrical termination.

With no termination (broken line),  is infinite, and the  terms vanish from the numerator and denominator of the transfer function,  If the end is perfectly grounded (shorted line),  is zero and the  terms vanish.

Remarks on notation
As in other sections of this article, the formulas can be made somewhat more compact by using the secondary parameters

replacing the product and ratio square root factors written out explicitly in the definition of  hence

The Fourier transforms used above are the symmetric versions, with the same factor of  multiplying the integrals of both the forward and inverse transforms. This is not essential; other versions of the Fourier transform can be used, with appropriate juggling of the coefficients that ensures their product remains

Lossless transmission
When  and  wire resistance and insulation conductance can be neglected, and the transmission line is considered as an ideal lossless structure. The telegrapher's equations then describe the relationship between the voltage  and the current  along the transmission line, each of which is a function of position  and time :

The equations for lossless transmission lines
The equations themselves consist of a pair of coupled, first-order, partial differential equations. The first equation shows that the induced voltage is related to the time rate-of-change of the current through the cable inductance, while the second shows, similarly, that the current drawn by the cable capacitance is related to the time rate-of-change of the voltage.

The telegrapher's equations are developed in similar forms in the following references: 
Kraus (1989), Hayt (1989), Marshall (1987), Sadiku (1989), Harrington (1961), Karakash (1950) and 
Metzger & Vabre (1969).

These equations may be combined to form two exact wave equations, one for voltage , the other for current :

where

is the propagation speed of waves traveling through the transmission line.  For transmission lines made of parallel perfect conductors with vacuum between them, this speed is equal to the speed of light.

Sinusoidal steady-state
In the case of sinusoidal steady-state (i.e., when a pure sinusoidal voltage is applied and transients have ceased), the voltage and current take the form of single-tone sine waves:

where  is the angular frequency of the steady-state wave.  In this case, the telegrapher's equations reduce to

Likewise, the wave equations reduce to

where  is the wave number:

Each of these two equations is in the form of the one-dimensional Helmholtz equation.

In the lossless case, it is possible to show that

and

The lossless line and distortionless line are discussed in Sadiku (1989) and Marshall (1987).

Loss-free case, general solution 
In the loss-free case, the most general solution of the wave equation for the voltage is the sum of a forward traveling wave and a backward traveling wave:

where
 and  can be any two analytic functions, and
 is the waveform's propagation speed (also known as phase velocity).

 represents the amplitude profile of a wave traveling from left to right in a positive  direction whilst 
 represents the amplitude profile of a wave traveling from right to left. It can be seen that the instantaneous voltage at any point  on the line is the sum of the voltages due to both waves.

Using the current  and voltage  relations given by the telegrapher's equations, we can write

Lossy transmission line

These extra terms cause the signal to decay and spread out with time and distance. If the transmission line is only slightly lossy ( and ), signal strength will decay over distance as  where

Signal pattern examples

Depending on the parameters of the telegraph equation, the changes of the signal level distribution along the length of the single-dimensional transmission medium may take the shape of the simple wave, wave with decrement, or the diffusion-like pattern of the telegraph equation. The shape of the diffusion-like pattern is caused by the effect of the shunt capacitance.

Antennas
In the first approximation, the current in a thin antenna is distributedexactly as in a transmission line. — Schelkunoff & Friis (1952)

Because the conductor of an antenna element closely approximates a single-conductor transmission line, the telegrapher's equations can be used to analyze antenna currents, as was commonly done in the first half of the 20th century, before the common availability of computing equipment.

Solutions of the telegrapher's equations as circuit components

The solutions of the telegrapher's equations can be inserted directly into a circuit as components. The circuit in the top figure implements the solutions of the telegrapher's equations.

The bottom circuit is derived from the top circuit by source transformations. It also implements the solutions of the telegrapher's equations.

The solution of the telegrapher's equations can be expressed as an ABCD type two-port network with the following defining equations

where

and

just as in the preceding sections.

In the bottom circuit, all voltages except the port voltages are with respect to ground and the differential amplifiers have connections to ground not shown. An example of a transmission line modeled by this circuit would be a balanced transmission line such as a telephone line. The impedance o(), the voltage dependent current sources (VDCSs) and the difference amplifiers (the triangle with the number "1") account for the interaction of the transmission line with the external circuit. The blocks account for delay, attenuation, dispersion and whatever happens to the signal in transit. One of the blocks marked "()" carries the forward wave and the other carries the backward wave. The depicted circuit is fully symmetric, although it is not drawn that way.

Every two-wire or balanced transmission line has an implicit (or in some cases explicit) third wire which is called the shield, sheath, common, earth, or ground. So every two-wire balanced transmission line has two modes which are nominally called the differential mode and common mode. The circuit shown in the bottom diagram only can model the differential mode.

In the top circuit, the voltage doublers, the difference amplifiers, and impedances o() account for the interaction of the transmission line with the external circuit. This circuit, as depicted, is also fully symmetric, and also not drawn that way. This circuit is a useful equivalent for an unbalanced transmission line like a coaxial cable or a microstrip line.

These are not unique: Other equivalent circuits are possible.

See also
 Reflections of signals on conducting lines
 Law of squares, Lord Kelvin's preliminary work on this subject

Notes

References
 

Hyperbolic partial differential equations
Distributed element circuits
Transmission lines